Lake Gunung Tujuh or The Seven Mountain Lake in English is a volcanic crater lake in the province of Jambi, Indonesia, located at  within Kerinci National Park. Although a young lake, in geologic terms, its surrounding volcano, Mount Tujuh, is old and not immediately obvious as such. The name "Danau Gunung Tujuh" translates as "Seven Mountain Lake," a seeming reference to seven peaks comprising the forested rim. The tallest of them rises 2732m above sea level, while the lake surface sits at 2005m. The lake is a popular overnight hiking destination among Park visitors and is sometimes fished by locals. Mount Kerinci stands nearby.

See also
 List of lakes of Indonesia

External links

Kerinci Seblat National Park: Lake Gunung Tujuh

Calderas of Indonesia
Lakes of Sumatra
Landforms of Jambi
Volcanic crater lakes
Volcanoes of Sumatra